ActiveCampaign is a cloud software platform for small-to-mid-sized businesses and is based in Chicago, Illinois. The company offers software for customer experience automation (CXA), which combines the transactional email, email marketing, marketing automation, sales automation, and CRM categories.

History 

ActiveCampaign was founded by Jason VandeBoom in 2003. It started as a consulting firm, and then as an on-premises software provider, helping small and midsize businesses automate marketing tasks and manage contacts. The company would later transition from on-premises software to a software as a service business focused on marketing and sales automation. As of 2021, ActiveCampaign has over 145,000 clients and $165 million in recurring revenue, with customers in 170 countries. ActiveCampaign raised $20 million from Silversmith Capital Partners in 2016. In February 2020 it raised $100 million in a Series B round led by Susquehanna Growth Equity, joined by Silversmith. In April 2021 it raised $240 million in a Series C round led by Tiger Global with participation from Dragoneer, Susquehanna Growth Equity and Silversmith Capital Partners. ActiveCampaign acquired Postmark, a transactional email delivery system, along with Postmark’s platforms, DMARC Digests and Postmark Labs in May 2022.

ActiveCampaign is headquartered in Chicago with offices in Indianapolis, Sydney, Australia, Dublin, Ireland. and Florianopolis, Brazil.

Software and services 

ActiveCampaign provides cloud-based marketing and sales automation software with features for email marketing, lead scoring and web analytics, a CRM platform, and a live chat messaging platform called Conversations. The 2022 Postmark acquisition makes transactional email available to non-technical users, “allowing them to send transactional emails with automation, rather than custom coding and APIs.”  ActiveCampaign distinguishes its software, called customer experience automation (CXA), from traditional email marketing and CRM platforms by extending its services into customer support. ActiveCampaign integrates with over 850 applications, including Salesforce, WordPress, Shopify, PayPal, Stripe, Gmail, Calendly, Slack, Facebook, and WooCommerce.

According to PC Magazine, "ActiveCampaign offers a lot of features for a relatively low price. The downside is that it can be confusing to use at times; thankfully, its help resources are plentiful. Solutions Review pointed out, "Users have access to detailed behavior tracking capabilities as well as precision marketing options through segmentation." ActiveCampaign appeared on Crain's Chicago Business 2018, 2019, and 2021 best places to work lists, Inc.com's 2018 list of best workplaces, Chicago Tribune's 2018 list of top midsize workplaces, and Built In Chicago's list of 100 best places to work in Chicago. ActiveCampaign is a unicorn company, as it is a privately-held startup valued at over $1 billion.

References 

Companies based in Chicago
2003 establishments in Illinois
American companies established in 2003
Email marketing software
Digital marketing companies of the United States
Customer relationship management software companies
Cloud applications